The list of cathedrals in British Overseas Territories is organised by territory.

Bermuda
List of cathedrals in Bermuda

Falkland Islands
Christ Church Cathedral, Stanley

Gibraltar

Saint Helena
Saint Paul's Cathedral (Anglican)

See also
List of cathedrals in the United Kingdom

British Overseas Territories
Lists
Cathedrals
Cathedrals